Ulotrichopus varius is a moth of the  family Erebidae. It is found in Uganda.

References

Moths described in 2005
Ulotrichopus
Moths of Africa